Steven Weinstein may refer to:

 Steven Weinstein (philosopher), Canadian philosopher
 Steve Weinstein (b. 1964), American professional bridge and poker player